Claude Jacqueline Pompidou (née Cahour; 13 November 1912 – 3 July 2007) was the wife of President of France Georges Pompidou.  She was a philanthropist and a patron of modern art, especially through the Centre Georges Pompidou.

Life before politics

She was born Claude Jacqueline Cahour in Château-Gontier, Mayenne, one of two daughters of a doctor.  Her mother died when she was three years old.

She moved to Paris to study law.  She met Georges Pompidou, her future husband, during the first year of her studies; he was then working as a literature teacher at a lycée.  The couple married in 1935.  Their adopted son, Alain Pompidou, was born in 1942.

Georges Pompidou fought in the Battle of France in the Second World War, before resuming his career as a teacher.  He joined the staff of Charles de Gaulle after France was liberated.  He joined de Rothschild Frères as a banker in 1953, and became general manager of a bank in 1956.

Political life

De Gaulle appointed Georges Pompidou as Prime Minister of France in 1962 and he served until 1968.  The couple did not move to the Prime Minister's official residence at the Hôtel Matignon, staying instead in their apartment in Quai de Béthune on Île Saint-Louis.  Pompidou won public acclaim for his handling of the May 1968 strike but it caused friction with De Gaulle, leading to his resignation as Prime Minister once the crisis had passed.  Meanwhile, Mme Pompidou was noted for her interest in fashion.

Pompidou ran for the Presidency in 1969 and was elected, but Mme Pompidou did not enjoy political life, once calling the Élysée Palace a "house of sadness".  The couple redecorated its rooms in the modern style, with painted aluminium walls and colourful carpets by Yaacov Agam, and soft furnishings by Pierre Paulin.  Her husband died in office in 1974.  The daring decorations were removed by the next President, Valéry Giscard d'Estaing.

Philanthropy

In 1970, Mme Pompidou set up the Claude Pompidou Foundation to help disabled children, the elderly and hospitalised. Jacques Chirac served as the Treasurer of the Foundation for over three decades. His wife Bernadette Chirac became the president of the Foundation, following the death of Mme Pompidou.

Pompidou Centre

Pompidou played a key role in establishing the Centre Georges Pompidou. The building was designed by Renzo Piano and Richard Rogers (it is said that Georges Pompidou didn't approve of the choice of the jury who picked up Piano and Rogers, and that he would have preferred a more classic architecture) and the choice of artwork for the Centre was based largely of her knowledge of her husband's tastes. She was particularly inspired by the work of Yves Klein.  Pompidou continued to play an active role in French artistic life in subsequent decades. She also played an active role in the foundation.

She published her memoirs, L’Élan du Coeur, in 1997. She died in Paris. The funeral service was held in church Saint-Louis-en-l'Île in presence of president Nicolas Sarkozy, former president Jacques Chirac, Farah Pahlavi, Princess  Caroline of Monaco, Maurice Druon and business woman Liliane Bettencourt.

References

External links 
Fondation Claude Pompidou

1912 births
2007 deaths
People from Château-Gontier
Spouses of French presidents
Spouses of prime ministers of France
French philanthropists
French socialites
20th-century philanthropists